Lethal Weapon 2 is a 1989 American buddy cop action comedy film directed by Richard Donner, and starring Mel Gibson, Danny Glover, Joe Pesci, Joss Ackland, Derrick O'Connor and Patsy Kensit. It is a sequel to the 1987 film Lethal Weapon and the second installment in the Lethal Weapon film series.

Gibson and Glover respectively reprise their roles as LAPD officers Martin Riggs and Roger Murtaugh, who protect an irritating federal witness (Pesci), while taking on a gang of South African drug dealers hiding behind diplomatic immunity. The film was nominated for an Academy Award for Best Sound Editing (for Robert G. Henderson). The film received mostly positive reviews and earned more than $227 million worldwide.

Plot
Two years after the events of the first film, LAPD sergeants Martin Riggs and Roger Murtaugh are pursuing unidentified suspects suspected of drug trafficking, only to find they have been transporting an illegal shipment of gold in the form of krugerrand coins from The Afrikaner apartheid government of South Africa.  Later, consul-general Arjen Rudd and security agent Pieter Vorstedt kill Hans, their man who lost the shipment of krugerrand, and debate how to stir the police away from their activities. Pieter suggests warning Murtaugh off the investigation and commits a home invasion on his residence, causing Captain Murphy to reassign Riggs and Murtaugh to protecting an obnoxious federal witness, Leo Getz.

It soon becomes clear that both cases are related: after an attempt on Leo's life, Riggs and Murtaugh learn of the former's murky past laundering funds for vengeful drug smugglers. Leo provides them with information about how laundering works and leads them to the gang, but upon dispatching his would-be assassin and returning with backup they are confronted by Rudd, who invokes diplomatic immunity on behalf of his unscrupulous "associates", leaving the LAPD powerless to take action against them.

Though instructed to leave the case alone, Riggs begins to openly harass the South African consulate, defying Rudd and romancing his secretary, Rika van den Haas, a liberal-minded Afrikaner who despises her boss and his racial philosophy. Murtaugh enlists Leo's help in creating a scene at the consulate that wins the support of anti-apartheid protesters outside. Vorstedt is dispatched to murder all of the officers investigating them while Murtaugh deduces that Rudd is attempting to ship funds from his smuggling ring in the United States to Cape Town via Los Angeles Harbor. Two assassins attack Murtaugh at his home, but he kills them both with his contractor's nail gun, though Leo is abducted in the process.

After killing many of the investigating officers, Vorstedt seizes Riggs at van den Haas' apartment and discloses that he was responsible for the death of Riggs's wife years earlier during a botched assassination attempt on him. He has his men kill Rika by drowning her and orders them to do the same to Riggs, who escapes and brutally kills both of the men. He phones Murtaugh, declaring an intention to pursue Rudd and avenge his wife, Rika, and their fallen friends; the other policeman willingly forsakes his badge to aid his partner. After rescuing Leo and destroying Rudd's house, they head for the Alba Varden, Rudd's freighter docked in the Port of Los Angeles, as the South Africans prepare their getaway with hundreds of millions in drug money.

While investigating a guarded 40-foot cargo container at the docks, Riggs and Murtaugh discover Rudd's laundered drug money, but are locked inside by Rudd's men. They break out of the box, scattering two pallets of the money into the harbor in the process. Riggs and Murtaugh engage in a firefight with some of Rudd's men aboard the Alba Varden before separating to hunt down Rudd.  Riggs confronts and fights Vorstedt hand-to-hand, culminating when Riggs stabs Vorstedt with his own knife and crushes him by dropping a cargo container on him. Rudd retaliates by shooting Riggs in the back multiple times. Rudd again invokes diplomatic immunity upon seeing Murtaugh aim his gun at him; Murtaugh fatally shoots him and declares that his immunity has "Just Been Revoked". Murtaugh then tends to Riggs, whom he believes may be dying and encourages him to hang on and that he is not dead until he says he is.  Discovering Riggs survived the shooting, they share a laugh as more LAPD personnel respond to the scene.

Cast

Production

Shane Black and Warren Murphy's original Play Dirty script
Following the success of the first film, Warner Bros. and producers decided to make the sequel. Producer Joel Silver asked writer of the first film Shane Black to write the script for the sequel in the spring of 1987 and Black agreed. Although he was struggling with personal issues, Black still managed to write the first draft along with his friend, novelist Warren Murphy, co-creator of Remo Williams (the lead character of The Destroyer novels). Their original title for the script was Play Dirty. Although many people thought that their script was brilliant, it was rejected by Silver, studio and director Richard Donner for being too dark and bloody, and because in the ending of the script Riggs dies, while they wanted to keep him alive in case of further sequels. They also wanted the second film to focus more on comedy, while Black's draft focused more on courage and heroics, like Riggs willing to die to protect Murtaugh and his family, due to his love for them.

When his script was rejected, Black felt that he had failed the producers. He initially offered to give his payment back, but his agent talked him out of it. Black also refused to re-write the script and quit from the project after working for six months on it. Black later said how the problem with the second film was that they did too much comedy, and how he dislikes the third and fourth films because of the way Riggs' character was changed.

The final version of the script written by Jeffrey Boam that was used for filming was completely different from Black's draft, other than the scene where the stilt house is destroyed. The character of Leo Getz was originally a minor character in Black's draft with only one scene and few lines of dialogue. Some of the other differences include more graphic violence throughout the script, which included the South Africans being even more vicious than in the final film; at one point Shapiro, the female police officer working with Riggs and Murtaugh, is tortured to death by them. There was also a scene where Riggs gets tortured by them in a similar way to how he was in first film, but a lot worse. There was also an action scene in the script where a plane full of cocaine gets destroyed and cocaine falls over Los Angeles "like snow". In Black's script the final battle took place on hills covered with a big brush fire, and after destruction of the stilt house Riggs chases the main villain Benedict (Pieter Vorstedt in the film), a much different and more dangerous character in original script and Riggs' "arch-nemesis and worst nightmare" according to Black, into the heart of the fire, after which Riggs gets stabbed and dies slowly from his wounds. The last scene in the script was Murtaugh watching the video tape that Riggs made before the final battle since he knew that he was going to die, and on which he says goodbye to Murtaugh. Black's reason for killing Riggs in his draft of the script, as he said in an interview, was that in first film Riggs was a "suicidal mess" who did not care about living or dying but his friendship with Murtaugh and his family was what helped him, and him sacrificing himself to save them would be the last thing he would have to do to be fully at peace. Black also said how the death scene he wrote for Riggs was "beautiful" and would make the audience cry. Black later labeled his rejected Play Dirty script "the best thing I ever wrote" and said he learned to trust his instincts after this experience. Black's script was never released and despite attempts by fans to find a copy of it, it remains unreleased.

Director Richard Donner said in the film's Blu-ray commentary that the film was shot in such a way that it could be edited with two different endings, one in which Riggs dies and one in which he lives. Audiences in test screenings responded well to Riggs' survival, and this was kept, though the last shot in the film with the camera moving away from Murtaugh holding Riggs was shot for the ending in which he dies.

Jeffrey Boam's final script
When the original Shane Black screenplay was changed, he left the series. The rewrites that resulted in the final film are by Jeffrey Boam (screenwriter for Indiana Jones and the Last Crusade and The Lost Boys). Boam also did some uncredited re-writing of the script for the first film when Donner thought that some parts of it were too dark and violent. Boam initially wrote two different drafts for his re-write of  Lethal Weapon 2; one which was hard-boiled action script and one which had more comedy. He was told to mix the two drafts together and make a new one that was going to be used for filming. However, not only did Boam end up having to re-write the script many times even before filming started, but he also had to keep re-writing it during production since Donner would always want to improvise something new in a scene or demanded changes to be made on the script in the middle of filming. Boam also wrote the script for Lethal Weapon 3 and he once again had to re-write his script many times before and during filming of that sequel for same reasons. He also wrote an unused draft for the fourth film around January 1995 which had Riggs and Murtaugh fighting against a neo-Nazi survivalist militia group that was committing a terrorist attack in L.A.

Screenwriter Robert Mark Kamen said in October 2012 interview for craveonline that during the time when he was working as screenwriter for Warner Bros. and would often do lot of uncredited work on their films, he also worked on Lethal Weapon 2 and 3. He said how amongst large chunks of the stuff he added in Lethal Weapon 2 script during re-writes were all the parts with South African villains. Although he was uncredited for his work on this film, he did get a credit for his work on Lethal Weapon 3 because he did a lot more work on that sequel.

Originally, the character of Rika was intended to survive, with the last scene in the film being Riggs and Rika eating Thanksgiving dinner with the Murtaughs, but the director decided to kill the character to increase Riggs' motivation to destroy the South African drug smugglers. The film was the debut of Leo Getz (Joe Pesci), a crooked but whistle-blowing CPA who is placed in protective custody by Riggs and Murtaugh, and makes the detectives' more difficult due to his neurotic behavior. The Getz character remained a regular throughout the remainder of the film series.

Filming
The scene where Riggs is on the road outside Arjen's stilt house and grabs onto the front of the truck (the same scene with the surfboard killing a driver) was filmed on March 21, 1989. The opening chase sequence was filmed on November 28, 1988. The scenes where Riggs and Rika are ambushed by helicopters at night on the beach were filmed at Marineland of the Pacific in Rancho Palos Verdes, California, on "Cobble Beach". Other portions of the film were shot in Palm Springs, California.

The Star Wars series and Ghostbusters notwithstanding (which were released some years before), the film was among the first of the summer blockbusters to feature the 'title only' style of opening that would become an established feature of 'event' films from that point on.

Soundtrack
The soundtrack was released on Warner Bros. Records August 8, 1989, and was written and performed by Michael Kamen, Eric Clapton, and David Sanborn.

The track list released commercially is as follows:
 "Cheer Down" by George Harrison
 "Still Cruisin' (After All These Years)" by The Beach Boys
 "Knockin' on Heaven's Door" (Bob Dylan) by Randy Crawford, Eric Clapton and David Sanborn
 "Riggs"
 "The Embassy"
 "Riggs and Roger"
 "Leo"
 "Goodnight Rika"
 "The Stilt House"
 "The Shipyard/Knockin' on Heaven's Door"

The soundtrack also includes "I'm Not Scared" performed by Eighth Wonder, which features co-star Patsy Kensit on vocals, and The Skyliners performed "Since I Don't Have You", "This I Swear", "Lonely Way", "How Much", and "Believe Me"; however, none of these are included on the soundtrack album.

In 2013 La-La Land Records issued the complete score (plus the original soundtrack album) as Discs 3 and 4 of its Lethal Weapon Soundtrack Collection eight-disc set.

Release

Box office performance
Lethal Weapon 2 was the third most successful film of 1989 in North America (after Batman and Indiana Jones and the Last Crusade), earning nearly $150 million in the US and $80.6 million overseas.

Critical reception
Lethal Weapon 2 holds an 82% approval rating on Rotten Tomatoes based on 45 reviews and has an average rating of 7.00/10.  The consensus reads: "Lethal Weapon 2 may sport a thin plot typical of action fare, but its combination of humor and adrenaline, along with the chemistry between its leads, make this a playful, entertaining sequel." On Metacritic, the film has a weighted average score of 70 out of 100, based on 21 critics, indicating "generally favorable reviews". Audiences polled by CinemaScore gave the film a rare average grade of "A+" on an A+ to F scale.

The New York Times stated, "Though it includes a smashed car full of Krugerrands, a hillside house blown off its stilts and a bomb set under a toilet, the point of Lethal Weapon 2 is that Mel Gibson and Danny Glover get to race around in all that chaos, acting crazy. Before it skids out of control in the final sequence, the film is so careful to preserve its successful comic-action formula that it follows the most basic law of sequels. If you liked Lethal Weapon, you'll like Lethal Weapon 2; it's almost as simple as that." Los Angeles Times reviewer Michael Wilmington stated that "though it's nice to have a big-audience action movie attacking apartheid and the slaughter of sea mammals, instead of acting as an enlistment poster for the Army Air Corps, local vigilante groups or the reopening of the Vietnam War, the sentiments don't really transcend the car crashes."

Home media
Lethal Weapon 2 has been released on VHS and DVD numerous times, along with a singular Blu-ray Disc release.  The first DVD was released in 1997 and featured the film's theatrical version.  The Director's Cut was released in 2000.  Since then, numerous sets have been released that contain all four films in the series (featuring the same DVDs). The theatrical version was also released on Blu-ray in 2006.

References

External links

 
 
 
 
 

1989 films
1989 action thriller films
1989 action comedy films
1980s buddy comedy films
Apartheid films
American action comedy films
American action thriller films
American buddy comedy films
American buddy cop films
American detective films
American sequel films
American films about revenge
1980s English-language films
Fictional portrayals of the Los Angeles Police Department
Films scored by Michael Kamen
Films scored by Eric Clapton
Films directed by Richard Donner
Films produced by Joel Silver
Films set in Los Angeles
Films shot in California
Lethal Weapon (franchise)
American police detective films
Silver Pictures films
Films about United States Army Special Forces
Warner Bros. films
1980s buddy cop films
Films with screenplays by Shane Black
Films with screenplays by Jeffrey Boam
1980s American films